Charcana District is one of eleven districts of the La Unión Province in Peru.

Geography 
Other mountains are listed below:

References